Roman Gaev (born 20 January 1989) is a Belarusian professional footballer who plays for Tempo Rzeszotary.

References

External links 
 
 

1989 births
Living people
People from Babruysk
Sportspeople from Mogilev Region
Belarusian footballers
Association football defenders
Belarusian expatriate footballers
Expatriate footballers in Poland
FC Dnepr Rogachev players
FC Dinamo Minsk players
FC DSK Gomel players
FC Partizan Minsk players
FC SKVICH Minsk players
FC Isloch Minsk Raion players
FC Krumkachy Minsk players
FC Torpedo Minsk players
FC Chist players